The Nilgiri tahr (Nilgiritragus hylocrius) is an ungulate that is endemic to the Nilgiri Hills and the southern portion of the Western and Eastern Ghats in the states of Tamil Nadu and Kerala in southern India. It is the state animal of Tamil Nadu. Despite its local name, it is more closely related to the sheep of the genus Ovis than the ibex and wild goats of the genus Capra. It is the only species in the genus Nilgiritragus.

Etymology
In Tamil, the Nilgiri tahr is called வரையாடு (varaiaadu). The word varaiaadu is derived from the Tamil words wurrai meaning "precipice" and aadu meaning "goat". The word in ancient Tamil was வருடை (varudai). In Malayalam, the word is വരയാട് (varyaadu). The Nilgiri tahr was described as Capra warryato by Gray.

The genus name Nilgiritragus is derived from the Tamil word Neelagiri meaning "blue hills" and the Greek word trágos meaning "goat".

Taxonomy
Results of a phylogenetic analysis showed that the Nilgiri tahr forms a sister group with the genus Ovis and has been placed into the monotypic genus Nilgiritragus in 2005. It used to be placed in the genus Hemitragus together with the Himalayan tahr (H. jemlahicus) and the Arabian tahr (Arabitragus jayakari), which are both closer associated with the genus Capra.

Description

The Nilgiri tahr is a stocky goat with short, coarse fur and a bristly mane. Males are larger than females and of darker colour when mature. Adult males develop a light grey area on their backs, thus are called "saddlebacks".

Distribution and habitat
The Nilgiri tahr can be found only in India. It inhabits the open montane grassland habitat of the South Western Ghats montane rain forests ecoregion. These grassland habitats are surrounded by dense forests at the lower elevations. The Nilgiri tahrs formerly ranged over these grasslands in large herds, but hunting and poaching in the 19th century reduced their population.

Threats 
The Nilgiri tahr is primarily threatened by habitat loss and disturbance caused by invasive species, and in some sites by livestock grazing, poaching and fragmentation of the landscape.

Conservation

As few as 100 Nilgiri tahrs were left in the wild by the end of 20th century. Since that time, their numbers have increased somewhat; in a comprehensive study of the Nilgiri tahr population in Western Ghats, the WWF-India has put the population at 3,122. Per the wildlife census conducted by Kerala forest department in association with volunteers from College of Forestry and Veterinary Science under Kerala Agricultural University, from April 24–28, 2014, the number of animals in Eravikulam National Park has increased to 894 individuals. This is the highest ever count recorded in the national park, with the first census in 1996 finding only 640 tahrs. The other significant concentration is in the Nilgiri Hills, with smaller populations in the Anamalai Hills, Periyar National Park, Palani Hills, and other pockets in the Western Ghats south of Eravikulam, almost to India's southern tip. A small population of tahrs numbering around 200 is known to inhabit the Boothapandi, Azhakiyapandipuram, Velimalai, Kulasekaram, and Kaliyal Ranges in the Kanyakumari district of Tamil Nadu  and another small herd of less than 30 animals is known to inhibit Ponmudi Hills in Trivandrum district of Kerala.

See also
 Nilgiri Biosphere Reserve
 Wildlife of India

References

Further reading
 Rice, G. Clifford, Reproductive biology of Nilgiri tahr, Journal of Zoology, London (PDF)

External links

 ARKive - images and movies of the Nilgiri tahr (Hemitragus hylocrius)
 https://web.archive.org/web/20160110153501/http://nilgiritahrinfo.info/

Caprids
Mammals of India
Fauna of Kerala
Fauna of Tamil Nadu
Fauna of the Western Ghats
Endemic fauna of the Western Ghats
Nilgiri tahr